Micheal Haley (born March 30, 1986) is a Canadian former professional ice hockey forward. He played for the New York Islanders, New York Rangers, Florida Panthers, San Jose Sharks, and Ottawa Senators in the National Hockey League (NHL). Hayley's playing style is often described as an enforcer and infamously in a February 11, 2011, Islanders–Penguins game Hayley received 39 penalty minutes.

In 2021, he joined the Sarnia Sting of the Ontario Hockey League as an assistant coach.

Career
Haley was signed as a free agent to a two-way contract by the New York Islanders on May 19, 2008. At the end of the 2009–10 season Haley made his NHL debut with the Islanders against the New Jersey Devils, recording his first career NHL fight against Rod Pelley, on April 10, 2010. His first NHL goal was on February 11, 2011, against Brent Johnson of the Pittsburgh Penguins. In the 2011–12 season Haley played in 14 games with the Islanders.

Considered an enforcer, on July 1, 2012, Haley signed as a free agent to a two-year contract with Islanders rival, the New York Rangers. He was placed on waivers but went unclaimed in September 2012. He was assigned to the Rangers American Hockey League (AHL) affiliate, the Hartford Wolf Pack. In November 2013, Healey suffered a sports hernia that required surgery and missed over a month. He was named an alternate captain of the Wolf Pack in his second season with them. He played in nine games with the Rangers.

After two seasons within the Rangers' organization, Haley signed a one-year, two-way free agent contract with the San Jose Sharks on July 10, 2014. In his third season in the Sharks organization in the 2016–17 season, Haley played his first full season in the NHL, recording a career best 2 goals, 10 assists and 12 points in 58 contests, while leading the Sharks in penalty minutes with 128.

On July 1, 2017, Haley left the Sharks as a free agent and signed a two-year, $1.65 million contract with the Florida Panthers. Haley was brought over by the Panthers to add toughness to the team. During the 2017–18 season, Haley played in 75 games, the most of his career, and also led the NHL in fighting majors with 22 and penalty minutes with 212. At the beginning of the 2018–19 season, Haley entered the NHL/NHL Players' Association assistance program. Haley was limited to just 24 games that season approaching the trade deadline recording one goal and three points before he was placed on waivers by Florida on February 19, 2019. He was claimed the following day, returning for a second stint with the San Jose Sharks on February 20, 2019. He played a further 24 games with the Sharks, scoring one goal and three points.

On October 1, 2019, he moved back to the New York Rangers as a free agent, returning for a second stint on a one-year deal. In the following 2019–20 season, Haley remained on the Rangers roster and made 22 appearances as the club's reserve veteran forward, posting 1 goal. He suffered a serious injury and it was announced on February 8, 2020 that he would undergo surgery, missing the remainder of the season. Concluding his contract with the Rangers, Haley extended his professional career in agreeing to a one-year, two-way contract with the Ottawa Senators on November 13, 2020. He appeared in four games with the Senators. He missed the majority of the season with a groin injury. Following the season, Haley retired from the NHL.

Coaching career
In the 2021 offseason, he joined his former Ontario Hockey League (OHL) team, the Sarnia Sting, as a player development coach. In October 2021, he was promoted to an assistant coach with the Sting.

Career statistics
Bold indicates led league

References

External links

1986 births
Living people
Bridgeport Sound Tigers players
Canadian expatriate ice hockey players in the United States
Canadian ice hockey centres
Connecticut Whale (AHL) players
Florida Panthers players
Hartford Wolf Pack players
Ice hockey people from Ontario
New York Islanders players
New York Rangers players
Ottawa Senators players
San Jose Barracuda players
San Jose Sharks players
Sarnia Sting players
South Carolina Stingrays players
Sportspeople from Guelph
Springfield Thunderbirds players
Toronto St. Michael's Majors players
Undrafted National Hockey League players
Utah Grizzlies (ECHL) players
Worcester Sharks players